Alok R. Babu (born 2 May 1989), known as All Ok, is an Indian Kannada rapper, singer, actor & music-producer. He is known for Kannada rap songs like Don't Worry, Yaakinge, Happy, Nan Kannadiga, Deja Vu, Urban Lads and many more.

Personal life 
Alok Babu was born to Ramesh Babu and Tara Ramesh. He has a younger sister. He completed his PUC in Sri Bhagawan Mahaveer Jain College, Jayanagar, and later pursued his BBM degree from City college of management studies at Bengaluru. He produced the Kannada's first rap song, 'Young Engo'. Ever since, All OK produced new talents of Kannada Hip-Hop. 

He married Nisha Natarajan in November, 2019.

Career 
He started his career as lead singer in Kannada's first hip-hop band & album 'Urban lads' and acted as one of the lead for Kannada hit movie Josh. Since then he has acted in more than twenty five movies in five different languages and has composed, directed and produced many independent music videos which have been well received by the audience. 

All Ok's one of famous tracks, 'Don't Worry', was played and appreciated at BBC Radio London hosted by the popular RJ Ashanti Omkar. In addition, All OK's Don't Worry, was featured on Rolling Stone India.

Filmography

References

External links
 

Indian rappers
Male actors in Kannada cinema
Kannada male actors
Male actors from Bangalore
21st-century Indian male actors
1989 births
Living people